Nevins is an unincorporated community located in the town of Sherwood, Clark County, Wisconsin, United States.

History
The community was named after Sylvester Nevins, Wisconsin state senator and lumber businessman.

Notes

Unincorporated communities in Clark County, Wisconsin
Unincorporated communities in Wisconsin